St. Mary Catholic High School Brockville is the only Catholic high school in Brockville, Ontario. The school's current principal is Stephane Wilcox, with Christa Monds as the vice-principal. The school has a gymnasium, library, large guidance and special education departments, five science classrooms, four English classrooms, a construction lab, music room and a stage/drama room. St. Mary also features a "cafitorium" (auditorium that is transformed into a cafeteria). The school day commences at 8:05 am and concludes at 2:08 pm. Unlike the local public schools, St. Mary only has four periods per day.

See also
Catholic District School Board of Eastern Ontario

External links 



Education in Brockville
Educational institutions established in 1951
1951 establishments in Ontario
Catholic secondary schools in Ontario